Rewinder is a 2014 alternate history novel by Brett Battles.

Synopsis
Rewinder follows Denny Younger, a junior personal historian of the Upjohn Institute based in a North America that never experienced an American Revolution, who uses time travel to verify the chronology of the wealthy upper-castes of British society. While on assignment he disrupts the timeline and is faced with the choice to either restore the world to the history he knows or allow the new timeline to stand.

References

2014 American novels
Novels set in the American colonial era
American alternate history novels
CreateSpace books